Dorina Vaccaroni (born 24 September 1963 in Mestre) is an Italian former fencer, competing in the foil.

Biography
She received a gold medal in the foil team at the 1992 Summer Olympics in Barcelona and silver at the 1988 Summer Olympics in Seoul. At the 1984 Summer Olympics in Los Angeles she received a bronze medal in individual foil. After her competitive fencing career she became a cyclist, participating in master competitions. Vaccaroni is a vegan.

Achievements
Olympic Games

See also
Italian sportswomen multiple medalists at Olympics and World Championships

References

External links

 
 

1963 births
Living people
Italian female fencers
Fencers at the 1980 Summer Olympics
Fencers at the 1984 Summer Olympics
Fencers at the 1988 Summer Olympics
Fencers at the 1992 Summer Olympics
Olympic fencers of Italy
Olympic gold medalists for Italy
Olympic silver medalists for Italy
Olympic bronze medalists for Italy
Olympic medalists in fencing
Medalists at the 1984 Summer Olympics
Medalists at the 1988 Summer Olympics
Medalists at the 1992 Summer Olympics
Sportspeople from Venice
Masters cyclists
20th-century Italian women
21st-century Italian women